Stanmore is a London Underground station in Stanmore. It is the northern terminus of the Jubilee line and the next station towards south is Canons Park. The station is on the south side of London Road, part of the A410 and is in Travelcard Zone 5.

History
Stanmore station was opened on 10 December 1932 by the Metropolitan Railway (now the Metropolitan line). The station building and those on the branch were designed by the Metropolitan Railway's architect, Charles W. Clark, in the suburban style used on the company's other post First World War stations such as those on the Watford branch.

In 1934, a proposal to extend the Metropolitan line northwards was discussed by the London Passenger Transport Board's Engineering Committee as an alternative or complementary scheme to the extension of the Northern line from Edgware. It would have required 1.2 miles of double track tunnel to reach the proposed station at Elstree South with Metropolitan line trains continuing to Bushey or Aldenham. A revision of the proposal in 1936, considered extending the Stanmore line to Elstree. The proposals were not included in the plans eventually submitted for parliamentary approval in the LPTB's New Works Programme.

Following construction of deep-level tube tunnels between Finchley Road and Baker Street, the branch and most stopping services between Finchley Road and Wembley Park were transferred to the Bakerloo line on 29 November 1939. The Bakerloo line service was transferred to the Jubilee line on 1 May 1979.

In 2005, Transport for London began the construction of a third platform at the station. This was structurally complete by the summer of 2009 but could not be brought into use until new signalling equipment on that part of the line had been commissioned, the platform opening to use in July 2011.

Services 

The off-peak service in trains per hour (tph) is:
 12tph to Stratford

The peak service in trains per hour (tph) is:
 18tph to Stratford
 3tph to North Greenwich

Night Tube services:

 6 tph Stanmore – Stratford

Connections
London Buses routes 142, 324 and H12 and night route N98 serve the station.

See also
Stanmore Village railway station, a main line station to the south-west closed to passengers in 1952 and completely in 1964

References

Jubilee line stations
London Underground Night Tube stations
Tube stations in the London Borough of Harrow
Former Metropolitan Railway stations
Railway stations in Great Britain opened in 1932
Stanmore